The Schweizer RU-38 Twin Condor is a two or three-seat, fixed gear, low wing, twin boom covert reconnaissance aircraft.

RU-38 is the US military designation for the aircraft, indicating Utility, Reconnaissance. The Schweizer company model number is Schweizer SA 2-38A Condor and, in its three-seat configuration, Schweizer SA 3-38A Condor

Based on the Schweizer SGM 2-37 motor glider, a total of five RU-38s were produced between 1995 and 2005. The aircraft remains in production by Sikorsky Aircraft after acquiring Schweizer.

Background
The development of the Schweizer SGM 2-37 motor glider for training use at the United States Air Force Academy led to two reconnaissance versions of that design, carrying the company model numbers SA 2-37A and SA 2-37B. In Central Intelligence Agency, US Army  and US Coast Guard service these were designated RG-8A and B. The RG-8s were employed in border security and surveillance missions.

In the mid-1990s the Coast Guard decided that the aircraft would be more useful if their capabilities were improved to include night operations by the addition of more mission sensor equipment. Discussions with Schweizer Aircraft resulted in a plan to upgrade two RG-8As and build one new aircraft to provide a total of three.

Development
The RU-38 was intended to fulfill both the low altitude, quiet, over water/hostile terrain reconnaissance role and also the high altitude standoff surveillance role.

The design missions for the RU-23A were:
Border integrity
Counter-terrorism surveillance
Drug enforcement
Electronic intelligence
Fishery patrols
Illegal alien surveillance
Intelligence collection
Maritime patrol
Pollution patrol & environmental monitoring
Search and Rescue

In converting to the new RU-38A configuration, the conventional RG-8A airframe was greatly modified by:
Removing the single 235 hp (175 kW) Lycoming O-540-B powerplant
Installing two Teledyne Continental Motors GIO-550A engines with a 3:2 gear reduction to 2267 operating rpm. The engines are mounted one in the nose and the other in the rear of the fuselage.
Enlarging the crew compartment
Improving the engine mufflers
Increasing the wingspan from 56.5 ft (17.22m) to 84.13 ft (25.65 m)
Changing the single tail fin to a twin-boom configuration with two fins
Greatly enlarged sensor bays
Improved noise signature reduction
Tricycle landing gear replacing the conventional landing gear

RU-38A
The resulting aircraft bears little resemblance to the original TG-8. Installation of the twin-boom pods permits the carriage of more sensors. The left-hand pod houses an AN/APN-215(V) color multi-function X-band sea search radar with mapping capabilities. The right-hand pod houses the AN/AAQ-15 forward looking infrared (FLIR) and Low-Light TV enhanced vision systems.

For navigation the RU-38A originally carried both OMEGA and GPS receivers, although the Omega has since been removed with that system's withdrawal from service in 1997. The aircraft also has  HF, VHF and UHF radios for voice and encrypted voice communications, plus direction finding. The crew may also use night vision goggles.

The aircraft has no flaps and instead retains the top and bottom surface divebrakes of its sailplane ancestors. Maximum take-off weight of the RU-38A is 5300 lb (2404 kg)

The RU-38A is designed to transit to its operational area with both engines operating. Once in the surveillance area the rear engine would normally be shut down and the aircraft operated in "quiet surveillance mode". The second engine would be available for use in an emergency and for return to base at faster speed.

The first Coast Guard RG-8A was returned to Schweizer for conversion to RU-38A status on 24 January 1994. The initial plan called for the conversion of two RG-8As and then fabrication of one new RU-38A.

The first flight of the converted aircraft took place on 31 May 1995. The second USCG RG-8A aircraft that was earmarked for RU-38A upgrade crashed near Puerto Rico in 1996. As a result, the program was reduced to provide only two RU-38As to the USCG. The loss of the RG-8A delayed the program for many months and it was not completed until May 1997.

The first RU-38 was tested by the Air Force 445th Flight Test Squadron at Edwards AFB on behalf of the Coast Guard, starting in July 1998. The airplane flew some 100 test flights during the four-month program.

By September 1999 the two converted RU-38As had been delivered to the Coast Guard in Miami, Florida for operational employment. The RU-38As were flown in drug interdiction missions over the Gulf of Mexico and the Caribbean Sea, but they were reportedly grounded during 2000, due to problems with the aircraft meeting mission requirements or serviceability.

RU-38B
The company further improved the aircraft by replacing the two piston engines with two Rolls-Royce Allison 250-B17F turboprop engines which allowed raising the gross weight to 7200 lbs (3265 kg). The new aircraft carries the military designation of RU-38B.

The RU-38B has 140 cubic feet (4.0 cu m) of payload space  with a payload weight of 800 lbs (363 kg) available. The payload bays all have large access doors and are located both in the tailbooms and also behind the pilot and co-pilot seats in the fuselage. The latter space can also accommodate a third crew member, if required. Using pallet-mounted sensor packages the aircraft can be quickly changed from one mission to another.

The RU-38B is able to achieve quiet operation while loitering by using a propeller speed as low as 1000 rpm. This is possible because the sailplane-derived wing is efficient and flight at low airspeed can be sustained with low power. Exhaust from the front engine is routed overwing, reducing the noise footprint.

Two RU-38Bs were delivered to the US Department of Justice, one in 2004 and one in 2005.

The RU-38B model was still being actively marketed by Schweizer in 2011.

Certification
Neither the RU-38A or B was certified by the Federal Aviation Administration. Instead all aircraft operate as experimental aircraft in the Research and Development category.

Operators

Schweizer Aircraft - Two RU-38A and one RU-38B
United States Department of Justice - two RU-38B

Specifications (RU-38B)

References

External links

 
 Photo of RU-38A, N61428, serial number 1
 Photo of RU-38A configuration model

RU-38
1990s United States military reconnaissance aircraft
Twin-boom aircraft
Twin-engined push-pull aircraft
Low-wing aircraft
Aircraft first flown in 1995
Twin-engined turboprop aircraft